Hoseynabad-e Jadid may refer to:
 Hoseynabad-e Jadid, Darab, Fars Province
 Hoseynabad-e Jadid, Anbarabad, Kerman Province
 Hoseynabad-e Jadid, Zarand, Kerman Province
 Hoseynabad-e Jadid, Razavi Khorasan